Walcot Square is an 18th century garden triangle in Central London. The "square" is in the London Borough of Lambeth and has a very rare triangular shape.  Since 1968 in planning policy it is a Conservation Area. Three rows of houses front its communal green, granted Grade II listed status under the statutory protective and recognition scheme in 1981 (the mainstream and initial category).

Location and layout

North of a double row of homes with gardens, Brook Street, is Geraldine Mary Harmsworth Park in which stand Imperial War Museum and two cafes (on the site of a mental-health hospital). To the south is St Mary's Gardens, to the west an avenue, Kennington Road, and east is West Square.

The communal-green-centred street is in the SE11 postcode district. The nearest tube station is Lambeth North, 500 m north.

The late Georgian three-storey terraced houses, forming its stock (some of which due to slightly raised-above subterranean-only level basements), surround a private  communal garden, owned and maintained by the Walcot Foundation.  No №1 nor 64 exist; the highest of sets being the sole addition number, 68A, (on the evens sides of the estate) or 95 (odds side of the estate).

History

Each of the three terraced sides differ slightly in design but are all constructed from stock brick and stucco which contributes to the modestly formal domestic scene. Notable features include stucco door surrounds, black painted doors, and long casement windows with ornamental anthemion cast iron balconette and railings. № s9–81 (odds) were built by John Woodward; 16–24 (evens) by Charles Newnham; and 26–50 (evens) by John Chapman.

London Blitz
As with the rest of London, incendiary bombs hit some of the street in the London Blitz in World War II. Where buildings were destroyed comparatively new ones were put up to match the originals.

Notable residents
 William Henry Jones (1817-1885), vicar of Bradford-on-Avon, occupied № 19 (ex-№ 60).
 William Hosking (1800-1861), architect and civil engineer, occupied № 20 (ex-№ 4) From 1840–1841. Engineer to the West London Railway he designed Trinity Chapel in Poplar and claimed to have designed the Reading Room in the British Museum. He also held a professorship at King's College, London.
 Thomas Barnes (1785-1841), editor of The Times occupied № 77 (ex № 31).

Film and literature
 In Bleak House, by Charles Dickens and published in 1853, Mr Guppy, the law clerk, proposes to Esther and states he has taken a residence on Walcot Square
 Walcot Stores, on the corner of the street, features in scenes from the 1990 film The Krays
 Scenes from the 2014 film The Woman in Black: Angel of Death were filmed on the square.
 Scenes for the 2016 film Fantastic Beasts and Where to Find Them (film), and the 2018 sequel Fantastic Beasts: The Crimes of Grindelwald were filmed on the square. The neighbouring St Mary’s Gardens is the home of Newt Scamander.
 Walcot Square was the location of a number of scenes featured in ‘’The Electrical Life of Louis Wain’’, the 2022 film biopic of the surrealist painter Louis Wain.

References

External links 
 A Walk through Lambeth and Southwark

Squares in the London Borough of Lambeth
Conservation areas in London
Grade II listed parks and gardens in London
Garden squares in London